Dulchah (also Romanized as Dūlchāh) is a village in Safiabad Rural District, Bam and Safiabad District, Esfarayen County, North Khorasan Province, Iran. At the 2006 census, its population was 231, in 43 families.

References 

Populated places in Esfarayen County